The 1930–31 season was Arsenal's 12th consecutive season in the top division of English football. After winning the FA Cup the previous term, they claimed their first Division 1 title this season, finishing seven points clear of Aston Villa. Arsenal failed to retain the FA Cup, losing to Chelsea in the fourth round, but won the Charity Shield against Sheffield Wednesday in October 1930. Arsenal's top scorer in the league was Jack Lambert, who scored 38 league goals and 39 times overall. The club earned 66 points from 42 league matches, with 28 wins, 10 draws and 4 losses.
Arsenal started the season well, winning the opening two matches 4–1 away from home, and won the first five league matches, and remained unbeaten for the first nine, before beating league champions Sheffield Wednesday 2–1 in the Charity Shield. 
They then suffered their first defeat of the season, 4–2, at Derby County, before making up for it with a 5–2 win over challengers Aston Villa nearly a month later. 
In December Arsenal beat Blackpool 7–1 to finish 1930 on a high. The following month they beat Aston Villa after a replay in the FA Cup third round, though the cup run ended in the next round at Chelsea. Arsenal then claimed their biggest-ever league win at Highbury in a 9-1 annihilation of Grimsby Town, with David Jack hitting four and Jack Lambert grabbing a hat-trick. 
A 7–2 win at Leicester City and a 6–3 victory over Derby County helped Arsenal in their title charge, but were stopped in their tracks on 14 March in a 5–1 loss at Aston Villa. Nonetheless, a 3–1 win over Liverpool on 18 April ensured Arsenal won the league for the first of thirteen times in their history.

Results
Arsenal's score comes first

Legend

Football League First Division

Final League table

FA Cup

See also

 1930–31 in English football
 List of Arsenal F.C. seasons

References

English football clubs 1930–31 season
1930-31
1930-31